Philip Patrick Carmichael (25 January 1884 – September 1973) was a rugby union player who represented Australia. He won a gold medal in rugby at the 1908 Summer Olympics.

Rugby career
Carmichael, a centre, was born in Sandgate, Queensland, and played his club rugby career was played in Queensland. He claimed a total of 4 international rugby caps for Australia. His debut game was against Great Britain, at Brisbane, on 23 July 1904. He was selected in Australia's inaugural national rugby team to tour the northern hemisphere – Dr. Paddy Moran's First Wallabies for the 1908–09 Australia rugby union tour of Britain.

At the time, the rugby tournament for the London Olympics game may not have appeared to be of great significance. Australia had already beaten Cornwall, and the British county champions early in the tour, and Scotland, Ireland, and France had all turned down the Rugby Football Union's invitation to participate in the Olympic bouts. Neither the tour captain Moran, nor the vice-captain Fred Wood played, so Chris McKivat led the Wallabies to an easy 32–3 victory and to Olympic glory, in which Carmichael scored 11 points, then each Wallaby in that match were thereafter known as an Olympic gold medallist.

Phil Carmichael played in both Tests of the tour – the 6–9 loss to Wales at Cardiff Arms Park which was the first test played by an Australian team on British soil as well as the Test against England in January 1909 at Rectory Field, Blackheath – a match won by Australia 9–3.

See also
 Rugby union at the 1908 Summer Olympics

References

External links
 
 
 

Australian rugby union players
Australia international rugby union players
1884 births
1973 deaths
Rugby union players at the 1908 Summer Olympics
Olympic rugby union players of Australasia
Olympic gold medalists for Australasia
Medalists at the 1908 Summer Olympics
Rugby union players from Brisbane
Rugby union centres